Leszek Błażyński  (5 March 1949 – 6 August 1992) was a Polish boxer who twice won the bronze medal in the men's flyweight (– 51 kg) division at the Summer Olympics. He first did so in 1972, when Munich hosted the Games. Four years later in Montreal, he once again captured the bronze, after a loss in the semifinals against eventual winner Leo Randolph of the United States. 

Błażyński was born in Ełk, Warmińsko-Mazurskie. He committed suicide in 1992, aged 43, in Katowice, Śląskie. He suffered from depression after the death of his wife. He was buried at the Communal Cemetery in Katowice. He was survived by his son.

Olympic results
1972
 Round of 64: bye
 Round of 32: Defeated Chander Narayanan (India) 3-2
 Round of 16: Defeated Arturo Delgado (Mexico) 5-0
 Quarterfinal: Defeated You Man-Chong (South Korea) 3-2
 Semifinal: Lost to Georgi Kostadinov (Bulgaria) 0-5 (was awarded bronze medal)

1976
 Round of 32: Defeated Antônio Toledo Filho (Brazil) KO 2
 Round of 16: Defeated Fazlija Sacirović (Yugoslavia) 3-2
 Quarterfinal: Defeated Alfredo Pérez (Venezuela) 3-2
 Semifinal: Lost to Leo Randolph (United States) 1-4 (was awarded bronze medal)

References

External links
 
 
 Biography of Leszek Błażyński 

1949 births
1992 deaths
Flyweight boxers
Boxers at the 1972 Summer Olympics
Boxers at the 1976 Summer Olympics
Olympic boxers of Poland
Olympic bronze medalists for Poland
Olympic medalists in boxing
People from Ełk
Suicides in Poland
Sportspeople from Warmian-Masurian Voivodeship
Polish male boxers
Medalists at the 1976 Summer Olympics
Medalists at the 1972 Summer Olympics
Burials in Katowice
1992 suicides
20th-century Polish people